Wallace Hickford Mills (7 January 1915 – 24 November 1943) was an Australian rules footballer who played with St Kilda in the Victorian Football League (VFL).

Family
The son of Frederick Mills (1880-1966), and Emily Louisa "Emma" Mills (1866-1949), née Hickford, Wallace Hickford Mills was born in Middle Park, Victoria on 7 January 1915.

He married Edith Jane Edward (1915-2003) in 1939.

Football
He played in one First XVIII match for : against Footscray, at the Junction Oval, on 24 July 1937. He was promoted from the Seconds, and replaced Ken Mackie. He was relegated to the Seconds for the next week's match.

Military service
He enlisted for service in the Australian Military forces on 4 December 1939, and served overseas in the Middle East.

Death
He was killed in a motor accident in Far North Queensland while serving with the 2/41st Light Aid Detachment, Australian Corps of Electrical and Mechanical Engineers.

On 24 November 1943, Mills was fatally injured when the army truck he was riding in collided with a Royal Australian Air Force truck on the Innisfail-Cairns road. He died later that day at a hospital in Gordonvale.

He was buried at the Atherton War Cemetery.

See also
 List of Victorian Football League players who died in active service

Notes

References
 
 World War Two Nominal Roll: Warrant Officer Class II Wallace Hickford Mills (VX2998), Department of Veterans' Affairs.
 World War Two Service Record: Warrant Officer Class II Wallace Hickford Mills (VX2998), National Archives of Australia.

External links
 
 

1915 births
1943 deaths
Australian military personnel killed in World War II
Road incident deaths in Queensland
Australian Army personnel of World War II
Australian Army soldiers
Australian rules footballers from Melbourne
St Kilda Football Club players
People from the City of Port Phillip
Military personnel from Melbourne